Ahmed Al-Assiri (born 12 February 1952) is a Saudi Arabian sprinter. He competed in the men's 400 metres at the 1976 Summer Olympics.

References

External links
 

1952 births
Living people
Athletes (track and field) at the 1976 Summer Olympics
Saudi Arabian male sprinters
Olympic athletes of Saudi Arabia
Place of birth missing (living people)